Daniel Smailes is an Australian former professional rugby league footballer who played for the Newcastle Knights from 1997 to 2001.

References

External links
Rugby League Project Player Summary

Australian rugby league players
Newcastle Knights players
Living people
1976 births
Place of birth missing (living people)
Rugby league second-rows